Neoclassicism (also spelled Neo-classicism) was a Western cultural movement in the decorative and visual arts, literature, theatre, music, and architecture that drew inspiration from the art and culture of classical antiquity. Neoclassicism was born in Rome largely thanks to the writings of Johann Joachim Winckelmann, at the time of the rediscovery of Pompeii and Herculaneum, but its popularity spread all over Europe as a generation of European art students finished their Grand Tour and returned from Italy to their home countries with newly rediscovered Greco-Roman ideals. The main Neoclassical movement coincided with the 18th-century Age of Enlightenment, and continued into the early 19th century, laterally competing with Romanticism. In architecture, the style continued throughout the 19th, 20th and up to the 21st century.

European Neoclassicism in the visual arts began c. 1760 in opposition to the then-dominant Rococo style. Rococo architecture emphasizes grace, ornamentation and asymmetry; Neoclassical architecture is based on the principles of simplicity and symmetry, which were seen as virtues of the arts of Rome and Ancient Greece, and were more immediately drawn from 16th-century Renaissance Classicism. Each "neo"-classicism selects some models among the range of possible classics that are available to it, and ignores others. The Neoclassical writers and talkers, patrons and collectors, artists and sculptors of 1765–1830 paid homage to an idea of the generation of Phidias, but the sculpture examples they actually embraced were more likely to be Roman copies of Hellenistic sculptures. They ignored both Archaic Greek art and the works of Late Antiquity. The "Rococo" art of ancient Palmyra came as a revelation, through engravings in Wood's The Ruins of Palmyra. Even Greece was all-but-unvisited, a rough backwater of the Ottoman Empire, dangerous to explore, so Neoclassicists' appreciation of Greek architecture was mediated through drawings and engravings, which subtly smoothed and regularized, "corrected" and "restored" the monuments of Greece, not always consciously.

The Empire style, a second phase of Neoclassicism in architecture and the decorative arts, had its cultural centre in Paris in the Napoleonic era. Especially in architecture, but also in other fields, Neoclassicism remained a force long after the early 19th century, with periodic waves of revivalism into the 20th and even the 21st centuries, especially in the United States and Russia.

History
Neoclassicism is a revival of the many styles and spirit of classic antiquity inspired directly from the classical period, which coincided and reflected the developments in philosophy and other areas of the Age of  Enlightenment, and was initially a reaction against the excesses of the preceding Rococo style. While the movement is often described as the opposed counterpart of Romanticism, this is a great over-simplification that tends not to be sustainable when specific artists or works are considered. The case of the supposed main champion of late Neoclassicism, Ingres, demonstrates this especially well. The revival can be traced to the establishment of formal archaeology.

The writings of Johann Joachim Winckelmann were important in shaping this movement in both architecture and the visual arts. His books Thoughts on the Imitation of Greek Works in Painting and Sculpture (1750) and Geschichte der Kunst des Alterthums ("History of Ancient Art", 1764) were the first to distinguish sharply between Ancient Greek and Roman art, and define periods within Greek art, tracing a trajectory from growth to maturity and then imitation or decadence that continues to have influence to the present day. Winckelmann believed that art should aim at "noble simplicity and calm grandeur", and praised the idealism of Greek art, in which he said we find "not only nature at its most beautiful but also something beyond nature, namely certain ideal forms of its beauty, which, as an ancient interpreter of Plato teaches us, come from images created by the mind alone". The theory was very far from new in Western art, but his emphasis on close copying of Greek models was: "The only way for us to become great or if this be possible, inimitable, is to imitate the ancients".

With the advent of the Grand Tour, a fad of collecting antiquities began that laid the foundations of many great collections spreading a Neoclassical revival throughout Europe. "Neoclassicism" in each art implies a particular canon of a "classical" model.

In English, the term "Neoclassicism" is used primarily of the visual arts; the similar movement in English literature, which began considerably earlier, is called Augustan literature. This, which had been dominant for several decades, was beginning to decline by the time Neoclassicism in the visual arts became fashionable. Though terms differ, the situation in French literature was similar. In music, the period saw the rise of classical music, and "Neoclassicism" is used of 20th-century developments. However, the operas of Christoph Willibald Gluck represented a specifically Neoclassical approach, spelt out in his preface to the published score of Alceste (1769), which aimed to reform opera by removing ornamentation, increasing the role of the chorus in line with Greek tragedy, and using simpler unadorned melodic lines.

The term "Neoclassical" was not invented until the mid-19th century, and at the time the style was described by such terms as "the true style", "reformed" and "revival"; what was regarded as being revived varying considerably. Ancient models were certainly very much involved, but the style could also be regarded as a revival of the Renaissance, and especially in France as a return to the more austere and noble Baroque of the age of Louis XIV, for which a considerable nostalgia had developed as France's dominant military and political position started a serious decline. Ingres's coronation portrait of Napoleon even borrowed from Late Antique consular diptychs and their Carolingian revival, to the disapproval of critics.

Neoclassicism was strongest in architecture, sculpture and the decorative arts, where classical models in the same medium were relatively numerous and accessible; examples from ancient painting that demonstrated the qualities that Winckelmann's writing found in sculpture were and are lacking. Winckelmann was involved in the dissemination of knowledge of the first large Roman paintings to be discovered, at Pompeii and Herculaneum and, like most contemporaries except for Gavin Hamilton, was unimpressed by them, citing Pliny the Younger's comments on the decline of painting in his period.

As for painting, Greek painting was utterly lost: Neoclassicist painters imaginatively revived it, partly through bas-relief friezes, mosaics and pottery painting, and partly through the examples of painting and decoration of the High Renaissance of Raphael's generation, frescos in Nero's Domus Aurea, Pompeii and Herculaneum, and through renewed admiration of Nicolas Poussin. Much "Neoclassical" painting is more classicizing in subject matter than in anything else. A fierce, but often very badly informed, dispute raged for decades over the relative merits of Greek and Roman art, with Winckelmann and his fellow Hellenists generally being on the winning side.

Painting and printmaking

It is hard to recapture the radical and exciting nature of early Neoclassical painting for contemporary audiences; it now strikes even those writers favourably inclined to it as "insipid" and "almost entirely uninteresting to us"—some of Kenneth Clark's comments on Anton Raphael Mengs' ambitious Parnassus at the Villa Albani, by the artist whom his friend Winckelmann described as "the greatest artist of his own, and perhaps of later times". The drawings, subsequently turned into prints, of John Flaxman used very simple line drawing (thought to be the purest classical medium) and figures mostly in profile to depict The Odyssey and other subjects, and once "fired the artistic youth of Europe" but are now "neglected", while the history paintings of Angelica Kauffman, mainly a portraitist, are described as having "an unctuous softness and tediousness" by Fritz Novotny.  Rococo frivolity and Baroque movement had been stripped away but many artists struggled to put anything in their place, and in the absence of ancient examples for history painting, other than the Greek vases used by Flaxman, Raphael tended to be used as a substitute model, as Winckelmann recommended.

The work of other artists, who could not easily be described as insipid, combined aspects of Romanticism with a generally Neoclassical style, and form part of the history of both movements.  The German-Danish painter Asmus Jacob Carstens finished very few of the large mythological works that he planned, leaving mostly drawings and colour studies which often succeed in approaching Winckelmann's prescription of "noble simplicity and calm grandeur". Unlike Carstens' unrealized schemes, the etchings of Giovanni Battista Piranesi were numerous and profitable, and taken back by those making the Grand Tour to all parts of Europe. His main subject matter was the buildings and ruins of Rome, and he was more stimulated by the ancient than the modern. The somewhat disquieting atmosphere of many of his Vedute (views) becomes dominant in his series of 16 prints of Carceri d'Invenzione ("Imaginary Prisons") whose "oppressive cyclopean architecture" conveys "dreams of fear and frustration". The Swiss-born Johann Heinrich Füssli spent most of his career in England, and while his fundamental style was based on Neoclassical principles, his subjects and treatment more often reflected the "Gothic" strain of Romanticism, and sought to evoke drama and excitement.

Neoclassicism in painting gained a new sense of direction with the sensational success of Jacques-Louis David's Oath of the Horatii at the Paris Salon of 1785. Despite its evocation of republican virtues, this was a commission by the royal government, which David insisted on painting in Rome. David managed to combine an idealist style with drama and forcefulness. The central perspective is perpendicular to the picture plane, made more emphatic by the dim arcade behind, against which the heroic figures are disposed as in a frieze, with a hint of the artificial lighting and staging of opera, and the classical colouring of Nicolas Poussin. David rapidly became the leader of French art, and after the French Revolution became a politician with control of much government patronage in art. He managed to retain his influence in the Napoleonic period, turning to frankly propagandistic works, but had to leave France for exile in Brussels at the Bourbon Restoration.

David's many students included Jean-Auguste-Dominique Ingres, who saw himself as a classicist throughout his long career, despite a mature style that has an equivocal relationship with the main current of Neoclassicism, and many later diversions into Orientalism and the Troubadour style that are hard to distinguish from those of his unabashedly Romantic contemporaries, except by the primacy his works always give to drawing. He exhibited at the Salon for over 60 years, from 1802 into the beginnings of Impressionism, but his style, once formed, changed little.

Sculpture

If Neoclassical painting suffered from a lack of ancient models, Neoclassical sculpture tended to suffer from an excess of them. Although examples of actual Greek sculpture of the "Classical Period" beginning in about 500 BC were then very few; the most highly regarded works were mostly Roman copies. The leading Neoclassical sculptors enjoyed huge reputations in their own day, but are now less regarded, with the exception of Jean-Antoine Houdon, whose work was mainly portraits, very often as busts, which do not sacrifice a strong impression of the sitter's personality to idealism. His style became more classical as his long career continued, and represents a rather smooth progression from Rococo charm to classical dignity. Unlike some Neoclassical sculptors he did not insist on his sitters wearing Roman dress, or being unclothed. He portrayed most of the notable figures of the Enlightenment, and travelled to America to produce a statue of George Washington, as well as busts of Thomas Jefferson, Ben Franklin and other founders of the new republic.

Antonio Canova and the Dane Bertel Thorvaldsen were both based in Rome, and as well as portraits produced many ambitious life-size figures and groups; both represented the strongly idealizing tendency in Neoclassical sculpture. Canova has a lightness and grace, where Thorvaldsen is more severe; the difference is exemplified in their respective groups of the Three Graces. All these, and Flaxman, were still active in the 1820s, and Romanticism was slow to impact sculpture, where versions of Neoclassicism remained the dominant style for most of the 19th century.

An early Neoclassicist in sculpture was the Swede Johan Tobias Sergel. John Flaxman was also, or mainly, a sculptor, mostly producing severely classical reliefs that are comparable in style to his prints; he also designed and modelled Neoclassical ceramics for Josiah Wedgwood for several years. Johann Gottfried Schadow and his son Rudolph, one of the few Neoclassical sculptors to die young, were the leading German artists, with Franz Anton von Zauner in Austria. The late Baroque Austrian sculptor Franz Xaver Messerschmidt turned to Neoclassicism in mid-career, shortly before he appears to have suffered some kind of mental crisis, after which he retired to the country and devoted himself to the highly distinctive "character heads" of bald figures pulling extreme facial expressions. Like Piranesi's Carceri, these enjoyed a great revival of interest during the age of psychoanalysis in the early 20th century. The Dutch Neoclassical sculptor Mathieu Kessels studied with Thorvaldsen and worked almost exclusively in Rome.

Since prior to the 1830s the United States did not have a sculpture tradition of its own, save in the areas of tombstones, weathervanes and ship figureheads, the European Neoclassical manner was adopted there, and it was to hold sway for decades and is exemplified in the sculptures of  Horatio Greenough, Harriet Hosmer, Hiram Powers, Randolph Rogers and William Henry Rinehart.

Architecture and the decorative arts

 

Neoclassical art was traditional and new, historical and modern, conservative and progressive all at the same time.

Neoclassicism first gained influence in England and France, through a generation of French art students trained in Rome and influenced by the writings of Winckelmann, and it was quickly adopted by progressive circles in other countries such as Sweden, Poland and Russia. At first, classicizing decor was grafted onto familiar European forms, as in the interiors for Catherine II's lover, Count Orlov, designed by an Italian architect with a team of Italian stuccadori: only the isolated oval medallions like cameos and the bas-relief overdoors hint of Neoclassicism; the furnishings are fully Italian Rococo.

A second Neoclassic wave, more severe, more studied (through the medium of engravings) and more consciously archaeological, is associated with the height of the Napoleonic Empire. In France, the first phase of Neoclassicism was expressed in the "Louis XVI style", and the second in the styles called "Directoire" or Empire. The Rococo style remained popular in Italy until the Napoleonic regimes brought the new archaeological classicism, which was embraced as a political statement by young, progressive, urban Italians with republican leanings.

In the decorative arts, Neoclassicism is exemplified in Empire furniture made in Paris, London, New York, Berlin; in Biedermeier furniture made in Austria; in Karl Friedrich Schinkel's museums in Berlin, Sir John Soane's Bank of England in London and the newly built "capitol" in Washington, D.C.; and in Wedgwood's bas reliefs and "black basaltes" vases. The style was international; Scots architect Charles Cameron created palatial Italianate interiors for the German-born Catherine II the Great, in Russian St. Petersburg.

Indoors, Neoclassicism made a discovery of the genuine classic interior, inspired by the rediscoveries at Pompeii and Herculaneum. These had begun in the late 1740s, but only achieved a wide audience in the 1760s, with the first luxurious volumes of tightly controlled distribution of Le Antichità di Ercolano (The Antiquities of Herculaneum). The antiquities of Herculaneum showed that even the most classicizing interiors of the Baroque, or the most "Roman" rooms of William Kent were based on basilica and temple exterior architecture turned outside in, hence their often bombastic appearance to modern eyes: pedimented window frames turned into gilded mirrors, fireplaces topped with temple fronts. The new interiors sought to recreate an authentically Roman and genuinely interior vocabulary.

Techniques employed in the style included flatter, lighter motifs, sculpted in low frieze-like relief or painted in monotones en camaïeu ("like cameos"), isolated medallions or vases or busts or bucrania or other motifs, suspended on swags of laurel or ribbon, with slender arabesques against backgrounds, perhaps, of "Pompeiian red" or pale tints, or stone colors. The style in France was initially a Parisian style, the Goût grec ("Greek style"), not a court style; when Louis XVI acceded to the throne in 1774, Marie Antoinette, his fashion-loving Queen, brought the "Louis XVI" style to court. However, there was no real attempt to employ the basic forms of Roman furniture until around the turn of the century, and furniture-makers were more likely to borrow from ancient architecture, just as silversmiths were more likely to take from ancient pottery and stone-carving than metalwork: "Designers and craftsmen ... seem to have taken an almost perverse pleasure in transferring motifs from one medium to another".

From about 1800 a fresh influx of Greek architectural examples, seen through the medium of etchings and engravings, gave a new impetus to Neoclassicism, the Greek Revival. At the same time the Empire style was a more grandiose wave of Neoclassicism in architecture and the decorative arts. Mainly based on Imperial Roman styles, it originated in, and took its name from, the rule of Napoleon in the First French Empire, where it was intended to idealize Napoleon's leadership and the French state. The style corresponds to the more bourgeois Biedermeier style in the German-speaking lands, Federal style in the United States, the Regency style in Britain, and the Napoleon style in Sweden. According to the art historian Hugh Honour "so far from being, as is sometimes supposed, the culmination of the Neoclassical movement, the Empire marks its rapid decline and transformation back once more into a mere antique revival, drained of all the high-minded ideas and force of conviction that had inspired its masterpieces". An earlier phase of the style was called the Adam style in Great Britain and "Louis Seize", or Louis XVI, in France.

Neoclassicism continued to be a major force in academic art through the 19th century and beyond—a constant antithesis to Romanticism or Gothic revivals —, although from the late 19th century on it had often been considered anti-modern, or even reactionary, in influential critical circles. The centres of several European cities, notably St. Petersburg and Munich, came to look much like museums of Neoclassical architecture.

Gothic revival architecture (often linked with the Romantic cultural movement), a style originating in the 18th century which grew in popularity throughout the 19th century, contrasted Neoclassicism. Whilst Neoclassicism was characterized by Greek and Roman-influenced styles, geometric lines and order, Gothic revival architecture placed an emphasis on medieval-looking buildings, often made to have a rustic, "romantic" appearance.

France

Louis XVI style (1760-1789) 

It marks the transition from Rococo to Classicism. Unlike the Classicism of Louis XIV, which transformed ornaments into symbols, Louis XVI style represents them as realistic and natural as possible, ie laurel branches really are laurel branches, roses the same, and so on. One of the main decorative principles is symmetry. In interiors, the colours used are very bright, including white, light grey, bright blue, pink, yellow, very light lilac, and gold. Excesses of ornamentation are avoided. The return to antiquity is synonymous with above all with a return to the straight lines: strict verticals and horizontals were the order of the day. Serpentine ones were no longer tolerated, save for the occasional half circle or oval. Interior decor also honored this taste for rigor, with the result that flat surfaces and right angles returned to fashion. Ornament was used to mediate this severity, but it never interfered with basic lines and always was disposed symmetrically around a central axis. Even so, ébénistes often canted fore-angles to avoid excessive rigidity.

The decorative motifs of Louis XVI style were inspired by antiquity, the Louis XIV style, and nature. Characteristic elements of the style: a torch crossed with a sheath with arrows, imbricated disks, guilloché, double bow-knots, smoking braziers, linear repetitions of small motifs (rosettes, beads, oves), trophy or floral medallions hanging from a knotted ribbon, acanthus leaves, gadrooning, interlace, meanders, cornucopias, mascarons, Ancient urns, tripods, perfume burners, dolphins, ram and lion heads, chimeras, and gryphons. Greco-Roman architectural motifs are also very used: flutings, pilasters (fluted and unfluted), fluted balusters (twisted and straight), columns (engaged and unengaged, sometimes replaced by caryathids), volute corbels, triglyphs with guttae (in relief and trompe-l'œil).

Directoire style (1789-1804)

Empire style (1804-1815) 

It representative for the new French society that has exited from the revolution which set the tone in all life fields, including art. The Jacquard machine is invented during this period (which revolutionises the entire sewing system, manual until then). One of the dominant colours is red, decorated with gilt bronze. Bright colours are also used, including white, cream, violet, brown, bleu, dark red, with little ornaments of gilt bronze. Interior architecture includes wood panels decorated with gilt reliefs (on a white background or a coloured one). Motifs are placed geometrically. The walls are covered in stuccos, wallpaper pr fabrics. Fireplace mantels are made of white marble, having caryatids at their corners, or other elements: obelisks, sphinxes, winged lions, and so on. Bronze objects were placed on their tops, including mantel clocks. The doors consist of simple rectangular panels, decorated with a Pompeian-inspired central figure. Empire fabrics are damasks with a bleu or brown background, satins with a green, pink or purple background, velvets of the same colors, brooches broached with gold or silver, and cotton fabrics. All of these were used in interiors for curtains, for covering certain furniture, for cushions or upholstery (leather is also used for upholstery).

All Empire ornament is governed by a rigorous spirit of symmetry reminiscent of the Louis XIV style. Generally, the motifs on a piece's right and left sides correspond to one another in every detail; when they don't, the individual motifs themselves are entirely symmetrical in composition: antique heads with identical tresses falling onto each shoulder, frontal figures of Victory with symmetrically arrayed tunics, identical rosettes or swans flanking a lock plate, etc. Like Louis XIV, Napoleon had a set of emblems unmistakably associated with his rule, most notably the eagle, the bee, stars, and the initials I (for Imperator) and N (for Napoleon), which were usually inscribed within an imperial laurel crown. Motifs used include: figures of Victory bearing palm branches, Greek dancers, nude and draped women, figures of antique chariots, winged putti, mascarons of Apollo, Hermes and the Gorgon, swans, lions, the heads of oxen, horses and wild beasts, butterflies, claws, winged chimeras, sphinxes, bucrania, sea horses, oak wreaths knotted by thin trailing ribbons, climbing grape vines, poppy rinceaux, rosettes, palm branches, and laurel. There's a lot of Greco-Roman ones: stiff and flat acanthus leaves, palmettes, cornucopias, beads, amphoras, tripods, imbricated disks, caduceuses of Mercury, vases, helmets, burning torches, winged trumpet players, and ancient musical instruments (tubas, rattles and especially lyres). Despite their antique derivation, the fluting and triglyphs so prevalent under Louis XVI are abandoned. Egyptian Revival motifs are especially common at the beginning of the period: scarabs, lotus capitals, winged disks, obelisks, pyramids, figures wearing nemeses, caryatids en gaine supported by bare feet and with women Egyptian headdresses.

Italy 
From the second half of the 18th century through the 19th century, Italy went through a great deal of socio-economic changes, several foreign invasions and the turbulent Risorgimento, which resulted in the Italian unification in 1861. Thus, Italian art went through a series of minor and major changes in style.

The Italian Neoclassicism was the earliest manifestation of the general period known as Neoclassicism and lasted more than the other national variants of neoclassicism. It developed in opposition to the Baroque style around c.1750 and lasted until c.1850. Neoclassicism began around the period of the rediscovery of Pompeii and spread all over Europe as a generation of art students returned to their countries from the Grand Tour in Italy with rediscovered Greco-Roman ideals. It first centred in Rome where artists such as Antonio Canova and Jacques-Louis David were active in the second half of the 18th century, before moving to Paris. Painters of Vedute, like Canaletto and Giovanni Paolo Panini, also enjoyed a huge success during the Grand Tour. Neoclassical architecture was inspired by the Renaissance works of Palladio and saw in Luigi Vanvitelli and Filippo Juvarra the main interpreters of the style.

Classicist literature had a great impact on the Risorgimento movement: the main figures of the period include Vittorio Alfieri, Giuseppe Parini, Vincenzo Monti and Ugo Foscolo, Giacomo Leopardi and Alessandro Manzoni (nephew of Cesare Beccaria), who were also influenced by the French Enlightenment and German Romanticism. The virtuoso violinist Paganini and the operas of Rossini, Donnizetti, Bellini and, later, Verdi dominated the scene in Italian classical and romantic music.

The art of Francesco Hayez and especially that of the Macchiaioli represented a break with the classical school, which came to an end as Italy unified (see Italian modern and contemporary art). Neoclassicism was the last Italian-born style, after the Renaissance and Baroque, to spread to all Western Art.

The UK

The Adam style was created by two brothers, Adam and James, who published in 1777 a volume of etchings with interior ornamentation. In the interior decoration made after Robert Adam's drawings, the walls, ceilings, doors, and any other surface, are divided into big panels: rectangular, round, square, with stuccos and Greco-Roman motifs at the edges. Ornaments used include festoons, pearls, egg-and-dart bands, medallions, and any other motifs used during the Classical antiquity (especially the Etruscan ones). Decorative fittings such as urn-shaped stone vases, gilded silverware, lamps, and stauettes all have the same source of inspiration, classical antiquity. The Adam style emphasizes refined rectangular mirrors, framed like paintings (in frames with stylised leafs), or with a pediment above them, supporting an urn or a medallion. Another design of Adam mirrors is shaped like a Venetian window, with a big central mirror between two other thinner and longer ones. Another type of mirrors are the oval ones, usually decorated with festoons. The furniture in this style has a similar structure to Louis XVI furniture.

Besides the Adam style, when it comes to decorative arts, England is also known for the ceramic manufacturer Josiah Wedgwood (1730-1795), who established a pottery called Etruria. Wedgwood ware is made of a material called jasperware, a hard and fine-grained type of stoneware. Wedgwood vases are usually decorated with reliefs in two colours, in most cases the figures being white and the background blue.

The United States

On the American continent, architecture and interior decoration have been highly influenced by the styles developed in Europe. The French taste has highly marked its presence in the southern states (after the French Revolution some emigrants have moved here, and in Canada a big part of the population has French origins). The practical spirit and the material situation of the Americans at that time gave the interiors a typic atmosphere. All the American furniture, carpets, tableware, ceramic, and silverware, with all the European influences, and sometimes Islamic, Turkish or Asian, were made in conformity with the American norms, taste, and functional requirements. There have existed in the US a period of the Queen Anne style, and an Chippendale one. A style of its own, the Federal style, has developed completely in the 18th and early 19th centuries, which has flourished being influenced by Britannic taste. Under the impulse of Neoclassicism, architecture, interiors, and furniture have been created. The style, although it has numerous characteristics which differ from state to state, is unitary. The structures of architecture, interiors, and furniture are Classicist, and incorporate Baroque and Rococo influences. The shapes used include rectangles, ovals, and crescents. Stucco or wooden panels on walls and ceilings reproduce Classicist motifs. Furniture tend to be decorated with floral marquetry and bronze or brass inlays (sometimes gilded).

Gardens
In England, Augustan literature had a direct parallel with the Augustan style of landscape design. The links are clearly seen in the work of Alexander Pope. The best surviving examples of Neoclassical English gardens are Chiswick House, Stowe House and Stourhead.

Neoclassicism and fashion

In fashion, Neoclassicism influenced the much greater simplicity of women's dresses, and the long-lasting fashion for white, from well before the French Revolution, but it was not until after it that thorough-going attempts to imitate ancient styles became fashionable in France, at least for women. Classical costumes had long been worn by fashionable ladies posing as some figure from Greek or Roman myth in a portrait (in particular there was a rash of such portraits of the young model Emma, Lady Hamilton from the 1780s), but such costumes were only worn for the portrait sitting and masquerade balls until the Revolutionary period, and perhaps, like other exotic styles, as undress at home. But the styles worn in portraits by Juliette Récamier, Joséphine de Beauharnais, Thérésa Tallien and other Parisian trend-setters were for going-out in public as well. Seeing Mme Tallien at the opera, Talleyrand quipped that: "Il n'est pas possible de s'exposer plus somptueusement!" ("One could not be more sumptuously undressed"). In 1788, just before the Revolution, the court portraitist Louise Élisabeth Vigée Le Brun had held a Greek supper where the ladies wore plain white Grecian tunics. Shorter classical hairstyles, where possible with curls, were less controversial and very widely adopted, and hair was now uncovered even outdoors; except for evening dress, bonnets or other coverings had typically been worn even indoors before. Thin Greek-style ribbons or fillets were used to tie or decorate the hair instead.

Very light and loose dresses, usually white and often with shockingly bare arms, rose sheer from the ankle to just below the bodice, where there was a strongly emphasized thin hem or tie round the body, often in a different colour. The shape is now often known as the Empire silhouette although it predates the First French Empire of Napoleon, but his first Empress Joséphine de Beauharnais was influential in spreading it around Europe. A long rectangular shawl or wrap, very often plain red but with a decorated border in portraits, helped in colder weather, and was apparently laid around the midriff when seated—for which sprawling semi-recumbent postures were favoured.  By the start of the 19th century, such styles had spread widely across Europe.

Neoclassical fashion for men was far more problematic, and never really took off other than for hair, where it played an important role in the shorter styles that finally despatched the use of wigs, and then white hair-powder, for younger men. The trouser had been the symbol of the barbarian to the Greeks and Romans, but outside the painter's or, especially, the sculptor's studio, few men were prepared to abandon it. Indeed, the period saw the triumph of the pure trouser, or pantaloon, over the culotte or knee-breeches of the Ancien Régime. Even when David designed a new French "national costume" at the request of the government during the height of the Revolutionary enthusiasm for changing everything in 1792, it included fairly tight leggings under a coat that stopped above the knee. A high proportion of well-to-do young men spent much of the key period in military service because of the French Revolutionary Wars, and military uniform, which began to emphasize jackets that were short at the front, giving a full view of tight-fitting trousers, was often worn when not on duty, and influenced civilian male styles.

The trouser-problem had been recognised by artists as a barrier to creating contemporary history paintings; like other elements of contemporary dress they were seen as irredeemably ugly and unheroic by many artists and critics. Various stratagems were used to avoid depicting them in modern scenes. In James Dawkins and Robert Wood Discovering the Ruins of Palmyra (1758) by Gavin Hamilton, the two gentleman antiquaries are shown in toga-like Arab robes.  In Watson and the Shark (1778) by John Singleton Copley, the main figure could plausibly be shown nude, and the composition is such that of the eight other men shown, only one shows a single breeched leg prominently.  However the Americans Copley and Benjamin West led the artists who successfully showed that trousers could be used in heroic scenes, with works like West's The Death of General Wolfe (1770) and Copley's The Death of Major Peirson, 6 January 1781 (1783), although the trouser was still being carefully avoided in The Raft of the Medusa, completed in 1819.

Classically inspired male hair styles included the Bedford Crop, arguably the precursor of most plain modern male styles, which was invented by the radical politician Francis Russell, 5th Duke of Bedford as a protest against a tax on hair powder; he encouraged his friends to adopt it by betting them they would not. Another influential style (or group of styles) was named by the French "à la Titus" after Titus Junius Brutus (not in fact the Roman Emperor Titus as often assumed), with hair short and layered but somewhat piled up on the crown, often with restrained quiffs or locks hanging down; variants are familiar from the hair of both Napoleon and George IV of the United Kingdom. The style was supposed to have been introduced by the actor François-Joseph Talma, who upstaged his wigged co-actors when appearing in productions of works such as Voltaire's Brutus (about Lucius Junius Brutus, who orders the execution of his son Titus).  In 1799 a Parisian fashion magazine reported that even bald men were adopting Titus wigs, and the style was also worn by women, the Journal de Paris reporting in 1802 that "more than half of elegant women were wearing their hair or wig à la Titus.

Later Neoclassicism

In American architecture, Neoclassicism was one expression of the American Renaissance movement, ca. 1890–1917; its last manifestation was in Beaux-Arts architecture, and its final large public projects were the Lincoln Memorial (highly criticized at the time), the National Gallery of Art in Washington, D.C. (also heavily criticized by the architectural community as being backward thinking and old fashioned in its design), and the American Museum of Natural History's Roosevelt Memorial. These were considered stylistic anachronisms when they were finished. In the British Raj, Sir Edwin Lutyens' monumental city planning for New Delhi marks the sunset of Neoclassicism. World War II was to shatter most longing for (and imitation of) a mythical time.

Conservative modernist architects such as Auguste Perret in France kept the rhythms and spacing of columnar architecture even in factory buildings. Where a colonnade would have been decried as "reactionary", a building's pilaster-like fluted panels under a repeating frieze looked "progressive". Pablo Picasso experimented with classicizing motifs in the years immediately following World War I, and the Art Deco style that came to the fore following the 1925 Paris Exposition des Arts Décoratifs, often drew on Neoclassical motifs without expressing them overtly: severe, blocky commodes by É.-J. Ruhlmann or Süe & Mare; crisp, extremely low-relief friezes of damsels and gazelles in every medium; fashionable dresses that were draped or cut on the bias to recreate Grecian lines; the art dance of Isadora Duncan; the Streamline Moderne styling of U.S. post offices and county court buildings built as late as 1950; and the Roosevelt dime.

There was an entire 20th-century movement in the Arts which was also called Neoclassicism. It encompassed at least music, philosophy and literature. It was between the end of World War I and the end of World War II. (For information on the musical aspects, see 20th-century classical music and Neoclassicism in music. For information on the philosophical aspects, see Great Books.)

This literary Neoclassical movement rejected the extreme romanticism of (for example) Dada, in favour of restraint, religion (specifically Christianity) and a reactionary political program. Although the foundations for this movement in English literature were laid by T. E. Hulme, the most famous Neoclassicists were T. S. Eliot and Wyndham Lewis. In Russia, the movement crystallized as early as 1910 under the name of Acmeism, with Anna Akhmatova and Osip Mandelshtam as the leading representatives.

In music
Neoclassicism in music is a 20th-century movement; in this case it is the Classical and Baroque musical styles of the 17th and 18th centuries, with their fondness for Greek and Roman themes, that were being revived, not the music of the ancient world itself. (The early 20th century had not yet distinguished the Baroque period in music, on which Neoclassical composers mainly drew, from what we now call the Classical period.) The movement was a reaction  in the first part of the 20th century to the disintegrating chromaticism of late-Romanticism and Impressionism, emerging in parallel with musical Modernism, which sought to abandon key tonality altogether. It manifested a desire for cleanness and simplicity of style, which allowed for quite dissonant paraphrasing of classical procedures, but sought to blow away the cobwebs of Romanticism and the twilit glimmerings of Impressionism in favour of bold rhythms, assertive harmony and clean-cut sectional forms, coinciding with the vogue for reconstructed "classical" dancing and costume in ballet and physical education.

The 17th-18th century dance suite had had a minor revival before World War I but the Neoclassicists were not altogether happy with unmodified diatonicism, and tended to emphasise the bright dissonance of suspensions and ornaments, the angular qualities of 17th-century modal harmony and the energetic lines of countrapuntal part-writing. Respighi's Ancient Airs and Dances (1917) led the way for the sort of sound to which the Neoclassicists aspired. Although the practice of borrowing musical styles from the past has not been uncommon throughout musical history, art musics have gone through periods where musicians used modern techniques coupled with older forms or harmonies to create new kinds of works. Notable compositional characteristics are: referencing diatonic tonality, conventional forms (dance suites, concerti grossi, sonata forms, etc.), the idea of absolute music untramelled by descriptive or emotive associations, the use of light musical textures, and a conciseness of musical expression. In classical music, this was most notably perceived between the 1920s and the 1950s. Igor Stravinsky is the best-known composer using this style; he effectively began the musical revolution with his Bach-like Octet for Wind Instruments (1923). A particular individual work that represents this style well is Prokofiev's Classical Symphony No. 1 in D, which is reminiscent of the symphonic style of Haydn or Mozart. Neoclassical ballet as innovated by George Balanchine  de-cluttered the Russian Imperial style in terms of costume, steps and narrative, while also introducing technical innovations.

Architecture in Russia and the Soviet Union 

In 1905–1914 Russian architecture passed through a brief but influential period of Neoclassical revival; the trend began with recreation of Empire style of alexandrine period and quickly expanded into a variety of neo-Renaissance, Palladian and modernized, yet recognizably classical schools. They were led by architects born in the 1870s, who reached creative peak before World War I, like Ivan Fomin, Vladimir Shchuko and Ivan Zholtovsky. When economy recovered in the 1920s, these architects and their followers continued working in primarily modernist environment; some (Zholtovsky) strictly followed the classical canon, others (Fomin, Schuko, Ilya Golosov) developed their own modernized styles.

With the crackdown on architects independence and official denial of modernism (1932), demonstrated by the international contest for the Palace of Soviets, Neoclassicism was instantly promoted as one of the choices in Stalinist architecture, although not the only choice. It coexisted with moderately modernist architecture of Boris Iofan, bordering with contemporary Art Deco (Schuko); again, the purest examples of the style were produced by Zholtovsky school that remained an isolated phenomena. The political intervention was a disaster for constructivist leaders yet was sincerely welcomed by architects of the classical schools.

Neoclassicism was an easy choice for the USSR since it did not rely on modern construction technologies (steel frame or reinforced concrete) and could be reproduced in traditional masonry. Thus the designs of Zholtovsky, Fomin and other old masters were easily replicated in remote towns under strict material rationing. Improvement of construction technology after World War II permitted Stalinist architects to venture into skyscraper construction, although stylistically these skyscrapers (including "exported" architecture of Palace of Culture and Science, Warsaw and the Shanghai International Convention Centre) share little with the classical models. Neoclassicism and neo-Renaissance persisted in less demanding residential and office projects until 1955, when Nikita Khrushchev put an end to expensive Stalinist architecture.

Architecture in the 21st century

After a lull during the period of modern architectural dominance (roughly post-World War II until the mid-1980s), Neoclassicism has seen something of a resurgence.

As of the first decade of the 21st century, contemporary Neoclassical architecture is usually classed under the umbrella term of New Classical Architecture. Sometimes it is also referred to as Neo-Historicism or Traditionalism. Also, a number of pieces of postmodern architecture draw inspiration from and include explicit references to Neoclassicism, Antigone District and the National Theatre of Catalonia in Barcelona among them. Postmodern architecture occasionally includes historical elements, like columns, capitals or the tympanum.

For sincere traditional-style architecture that sticks to regional architecture, materials and craftsmanship, the term Traditional Architecture (or vernacular) is mostly used. The Driehaus Architecture Prize is awarded to major contributors in the field of 21st century traditional or classical architecture, and comes with a prize money twice as high as that of the modernist Pritzker Prize.

In the United States, various contemporary public buildings are built in Neoclassical style, with the 2006 Schermerhorn Symphony Center in Nashville being an example.

In Britain, a number of architects are active in the Neoclassical style. Examples of their work include two university libraries: Quinlan Terry's Maitland Robinson Library at Downing College and Robert Adam Architects' Sackler Library.

See also

1795–1820 in Western fashion
American Empire (style)
Antiquization
Nazi architecture
Neoclassical architecture
Neoclassicism in France
Neo-Grec, the late Greek-Revival style
Skopje 2014

Notes

References

Clark, Kenneth, The Romantic Rebellion: Romantic versus Classic Art, 1976, Omega. .

 

 

 

 
 
 . Reprinted 1977.

Further reading
 Brown, Kevin (2017). Artist and Patrons: Court Art and Revolution in Brussels at the end of the Ancien Regime, Dutch Crossing, Taylor and Francis
 Eriksen, Svend. Early Neoclassicism in France (1974)
 Friedlaender, Walter (1952). David to Delacroix (originally published in German; reprinted 1980)
 Gromort, Georges, with introductory essay by Richard Sammons (2001). The Elements of Classical Architecture (Classical America Series in Art and Architecture)
 Harrison, Charles; Paul Wood and Jason Gaiger (eds) (2000; repr. 2003). Art in Theory 1648–1815: An Anthology of Changing Ideas
 Hartop, Christopher, with foreword by Tim Knox (2010). The Classical Ideal: English Silver, 1760–1840, exh. cat. Cambridge: John Adamson 
 Irwin, David (1966). English Neoclassical Art: Studies in Inspiration and Taste
 Johnson, James William. “What Was Neo-Classicism?” Journal of British Studies, vol. 9, no. 1, 1969, pp. 49–70. online
 Rosenblum, Robert (1967). Transformations in Late Eighteenth-Century Art

External links

Neoclassicism in the "History of Art"
 
Neo-classical drawings in the Flemish Art Collection
19th Century Sculpture Derived From Greek Hellenistic Influence: Jacob Ungerer
The Neoclassicising of Pompeii

 
 01
18th century in art
18th century in the arts
19th century in art
19th century in the arts
Age of Enlightenment
Art movements
Decorative arts
Early Modern period